Kolguyev Island is an island in Nenets Autonomous Okrug of Russia, located in the south-eastern Barents Sea (west of the Pechora Sea) to the north-east of the Kanin Peninsula.

Origin of the name 
There are different versions about the origin of the insulonym "Kolguev". According to one of them, the name of the island was given by the Pomors in honor of the fisherman Ivan Kalgov, who disappeared without a trace in the waters washing the island, according to another version, the name of the island comes from the ancient Finnish word "collage", which translates as "triangle" or "triangular".

Geography

The highest point on the island is at 166 m (545 feet). The vast wetland consists of many bogs and morainic hills, covered by vegetation characteristic of the tundra. Notably, a proposed subspecies of the Candle Larkspur, Delphinium elatum ssp. cryophilum, is only found on this island, but its distinctness from the mainland population is disputed.

There is only one inhabited settlement on the island, Bugrino, located on the southeast coast. Nenets form the majority of the population, with fishing, reindeer farming and trapping being their main economic activities. Oil and gas are also present.

Climate

Kolguyev Island has a tundra climate (Köppen ET) with an August mean of only . Because of its maritime location, Kolguyev Island experiences seasonal lag. Precipitation is higher in summer and autumn than in winter and spring, with the island receiving  of precipitation in total.

Highest Temperature:  on July 10, 1990;

Lowest Temperature:  on February 16, 1951;

Warmest Month:  on July, 2016;

Coldest Month:  on February, 1998;

Wettest Year:  in 1962;

Driest Year:  in 2017.

Report by Trevor-Battye
The island was explored in 1894 by the British naturalist
Aubyn B.R. Trevor-Battye. He landed in June with an assistant, intending to spend about one month studying the wildlife, especially the birds. Due to mechanical problems with the vessel and a misunderstanding, they were left stranded on the island for 12 weeks. He published his study of the natural history and topography of Kolguyev as: "Ice-bound on Kolguev" (Trevor-Battye 1895). The book includes observations on the Nenets (whom he called Samoyed) who brought their reindeer to the island for summer grazing and to trap geese for trade in Russia. Trevor-Battye eventually left the island with these reindeer herders in September 1894, and had to travel  overland from the Pechora River to Archangel. He described this adventurous journey in: "A northern highway of the Tsar" (Trevor-Battye 1898).

Economy 
The main occupations of the population of the village of Bugrino are reindeer husbandry and fishing. Bugrino is the base of the Kolguevsky industrial complex. In 2013 - 2014, due to the lack of sufficient food on Kolguyev Island, there was a massive death of deer. The livestock decreased from 12,000 to 200-400 heads  (according to other sources, up to 50 heads). Four workers remained in the reindeer herding state farm. There are interruptions in the supply of the population.

ArktikNeft is, along with OAO Arktikmorneftegazrazvedka, which specializes in oil exploration, the only continental company that has received a license to operate on the island. Exploration of the island began in 1980. In 1983, the Peschanoozerskoye oil field was discovered.

To date, only oil fields are being exploited. Gas production requires the construction of new infrastructures. ArcticNeft conducts all exploration, drilling, production, storage and transportation of crude oil. The deposits on the island are of excellent quality, with a very low sulfur content. There are 52 wells in operation (as of November 2002), which produce about 100,000 tons of oil per year.

The transportation of crude oil on the island between different production, processing and storage sites is carried out via an oil pipeline. Exports are carried out by sea in summer and autumn: tankers with an average capacity of 30,000 tons are loaded directly into the sea, 5,000 meters from the coast using a floating oil pipeline (siphon). All oil is exported to Rotterdam.

The workforce consists of oil and driller teams, two well service teams, transport personnel and administrative staff. The operation is carried out by two teams of 150 people each, which change every 52 days. The transportation of people and equipment from the island to the continent and back was carried out until the end of 2002 in winter by a helicopter connecting Arkhangelsk, Murmansk or Naryan-Mar with Kolguyev, and in summer and autumn by a steamer plying between Murmansk and the island. Since November 2002, ArcticNeft has had a runway capable of receiving medium-sized aircraft (Yak-40, An-24 and An-26), which the company uses mainly for its own needs, but also for the needs of the rest of the island's population, in particular, residents of the village of Bugrino.

In popular culture
Kolguyev Island appears as one of the theatres of battle in the Codemasters PC game Operation Flashpoint: Cold War Crisis. It is the only non-fictional location featured.

Images

References

External links
 Weather on Kolguyev



Islands of the Barents Sea
Islands of Arkhangelsk Oblast
Islands of Nenets Autonomous Okrug